Amata magrettii is a moth of the family Erebidae. It was described by Emilio Berio in 1937 and is found in Eritrea.

References

 Arctiidae genus list at Butterflies and Moths of the World of the Natural History Museum

Endemic fauna of Eritrea
magrettii
Moths described in 1937
Moths of Africa